Federico de Madrazo y Ochoa (1875, Rome - 1934, Madrid) was a Spanish painter working mostly in and around Madrid, although he also spent some time in Paris.

He was part of a famous family of Spanish artists which included his father Raimundo de Madrazo, his uncle Ricardo de Madrazo, his grandfather, Federico de Madrazo, and his great grandfather José de Madrazo.

He worked together with Jean Cocteau to write a ballet, Le Dieu bleu (The Blue God), in 1912 for Serge Diaghilev's Ballets Russes. Music for the ballet was composed by Reynaldo Hahn. He also painted Cocteau's most familiar portrait.

References

20th-century Spanish painters
20th-century Spanish male artists
Spanish male painters
1875 births
1934 deaths
Painters from the Community of Madrid
Spanish expatriates in France